Andrea Occhipinti (born 12 September 1957) is an Italian film producer and distributor. He is the founder of Rome-based film company Lucky Red.

Since 1987 he has distributed and produced international independent films, introducing Italian audiences to directors from all over the world, such as Paolo Sorrentino, Alejandro Amenabar and Lars Von Trier.

Since 1987 Andrea Occhipinti has distributed theatrically over 500 titles and produced over 50 films.

From 2013 to 2018 Andrea Occhipinti served as president of the Italian film distributor association ANICA, and resigning from the role in September 2018 following a controversy surrounding distribution of the Alessio Cremonin film On My Skin.

In 2014, he received a "David di Donatello" Special Award for his commitment in theatrical distribution. In 2015 he has been awarded with the European Film Award for Best European Co-Producer and in 2019, Andrea won his second "David di Donatello" as Best Italian Producer (for On my Skin).

References

External links
 
https://www.luckyred.it/chi-siamo/

1957 births
Living people
Film people from Milan
Male actors from Milan
Italian LGBT people
European Film Awards winners (people)
21st-century Italian LGBT people